Adam Thomas is an American politician serving as a member of the Kansas House of Representatives from the 26th district. He assumed office in 2019.

Early life and education 
Thomas was born in St. Charles, Missouri, and raised in Olathe, Kansas. He attended Belmont University.

Career 
Outside of politics, Thomas works as a restaurant manager. He was elected to the Kansas House of Representatives in 2018 and assumed office in 2019. During his campaign, he faced accusations that he lived outside his district. He was later charged with election perjury for giving a false address on election documents and reached a diversionary agreement. In the 2021–2022 legislative session, he serves as vice chair of the House Education Committee.

References 

Living people
Year of birth missing (living people)
Republican Party members of the Kansas House of Representatives
People from St. Charles, Missouri
Politicians from Olathe, Kansas